Pallikoodam Pogamale is a 2015 Indian Tamil language drama film written and directed by Jayasheelan. The film features Tejas, Aishwarya Raja in the lead roles while Ganesh Venkatraman and Srihari plays pivotal roles. This films features the debut of Tejas (son of actor Alex) and Aishwarya.  The film was shot at an international school near Kerala. This was Srihari's last film to date.

Cast 
 Tejas as Vijay
 Aishwarya Raja as Kayalvizhi  "Kayal"
 Ganesh Venkatraman as Ganesh Venkatram IPS
 Srihari as JP
 Dileepan Pugazhendi as Kumar
 A. Venkatesh as Vijay's father, a taxi driver
 Devadarshini as Vijay's mother
 Raj Kapoor as Kayalvizhi's father, a wealthy man
 O. A. K. Sundar as the school teacher
 Sriranjini as the church mother

Soundtrack

Reception 
M. Suganth of The Times of India wrote, "There is nothing edgy about the film, which, at times, feels like a tame retread of Thullovatho Ilamais theme minus the raging hormones." Maalaimaalar gave a negative review.

References 

2010s Tamil-language films
2015 films